Colonel Henry Arthur Cole (14 February 1809 – 2 July 1890) was an Anglo-Irish politician, cricketer and army officer.

Life 
Cole was the second son of John Cole, 2nd Earl of Enniskillen. He succeeded his uncle Arthur Henry Cole to be elected as a Conservative Member of Parliament for Enniskillen on 18 June 1844, resigning on 31 March 1851 through his appointment as Steward of the Chiltern Hundreds. He was appointed High Sheriff of Fermanagh for 1854.

He died in Willesden on 2 July 1890.

References

External links 
 
 "Hon. Henry Arthur Cole". (1860). National Portrait Gallery. 

1809 births
1890 deaths
Cole family (Anglo-Irish aristocracy)
Members of the Parliament of the United Kingdom for County Fermanagh constituencies (1801–1922)
Irish Conservative Party MPs
UK MPs 1841–1847
UK MPs 1847–1852
UK MPs 1852–1857
UK MPs 1857–1859
UK MPs 1859–1865
UK MPs 1865–1868
UK MPs 1868–1874
UK MPs 1874–1880
Younger sons of earls
Suffolk Regiment officers
High Sheriffs of County Fermanagh
English cricketers
Yorkshire cricketers